The 1968 All-Atlantic Coast Conference football team consists of American football players chosen by various selectors for their All-Atlantic Coast Conference ("ACC") teams for the 1968 NCAA University Division football season. Selectors in 1968 included the Associated Press (AP).

All-Atlantic Coast Conference selections

Offensive selections

Ends
 Henley Carter, Duke (AP)
 Fred Zeigler, South Carolina (AP)

Offensive tackles
 Joe Lhotsky, Clemson (AP)
 Greg Shelly, Virginia (AP)

Offensive guards
 Chuck Hammer, Virginia (AP)
 Don Jordan, NC State (AP)

Centers
 Carey Metts, NC State (AP)

Backs
 Buddy Gore, Clemson (AP)
 Frank Quayle, Virginia (AP)
 Leo Hart, Duke (AP)
 Bobby Hall, NC State (AP)

Defensive selections

Defensive ends
 Mark Capuano, NC State (AP)
 Ronnie Duckworth, Clemson (AP)

Defensive tackles
 Ron Carpenter, NC State (AP)
 John Cagle, Clemson (AP)

Middle guards
 Bob Paczkoski, Virginia (AP)

Linebackers
 Jimmy Catoe, Clemson (AP)
 Dick Biddle, Duke (AP)

Defensive backs
 Jack Whitley, NC State (AP)
 Digit Laughridge, Wake Forest (AP)
 Wally Orrel, South Carolina (AP)
 Gary Yount, NC State (AP)

Special teams

Kickers
 Gerald Warren, NC State (AP)

Key
AP = Associated Press

See also
1968 College Football All-America Team

References

All-Atlantic Coast Conference football team
All-Atlantic Coast Conference football teams